Lương Hoàng Nam (born 2 March 1997) is a Vietnamese footballer who plays as a central midfielder for V.League 2 club Công An Nhân Dân.

Honours
Công An Nhân Dân
V.League 2: 2022

References 

1997 births
Living people
Vietnamese footballers
Association football midfielders
V.League 1 players
Hoang Anh Gia Lai FC players
Haiphong FC players
People from Đắk Lắk Province